Daniel Addo  (born 6 November 1976) is a Ghanaian former professional footballer who last played for King Faisal Babes as a midfielder.

Club career
Addo enjoyed a ten-year career in Europe, and was hailed as one of the most talented players from Ghana in teenage years. Bayer Leverkusen signed him in 1992 (he was only 15), alongside teammate Sebastian Barnes. However, he never appeared for Bayer's first team, going on to represent Fortuna Düsseldorf (twice), Karlsruher SC, Wormatia Worms, FC Lustenau, Vardar Skopje, Sekondi Hasaacas F.C.

International career
In his international career, Addo was both a member of the Black Stars and the Black Meteors. He played for Ghana's U-17 at the 1991 FIFA U-17 World Championship in Italy, also appearing in the 1993 edition, in Japan. With the under-20, he played at the 1993 FIFA World Youth Championship in Australia.

Honours
Ghana U17
 FIFA U-17 World Cup: 1991

References

1976 births
Living people
Footballers from Accra
Ghanaian footballers
Ghana international footballers
1996 African Cup of Nations players
2000 African Cup of Nations players
Ghana under-20 international footballers
Ghanaian expatriate footballers
Association football midfielders
2. Bundesliga players
Fortuna Düsseldorf players
Karlsruher SC players
Bayer 04 Leverkusen players
Ghanaian expatriate sportspeople in Cyprus
Expatriate footballers in Austria
Wormatia Worms players
FK Vardar players
Expatriate footballers in Germany
Accra Great Olympics F.C. players
Expatriate footballers in North Macedonia
King Faisal Babes FC players
Nejmeh SC players
Expatriate footballers in Lebanon
FC Lustenau players
Ghanaian expatriate sportspeople in Germany
Sekondi Hasaacas F.C. players
Ghanaian expatriate sportspeople in Lebanon
Lebanese Premier League players